Stepping Out is a 1999 Singaporean Mandarin drama series adapted from a historical book, which reran several times like in 2006, 2019 and in 2021. It stars Yvonne Lim , Terence Cao , Cynthia Koh , Xie Shaoguang , Ivy Lee and Tay Ping Hui as the casts of the series.

The series focuses on the Chinese immigrant experience in Singapore, and their rough, hard ascent (along with the rest of Singapore) to the present state of wealth and riches that is unprecedented in Singaporean history. The drama begins in China and spans roughly three decades. It was produced following the success of the 1997 period drama The Price of Peace.

The story begins at the start of the Chinese Civil War during the 1920s. The chaos and upheaval which entailed caused many Chinese to migrate to Southeast Asia, mainly Malaysia and Singapore, and sets the background for the series. The Hock Lee bus riots and Chinese middle schools riots of the 1950s were referenced and clips of the actual incidents were shown.

Plot

It is the 1920s, a time of great chaos in China. Poverty was rampant in many regions, forcing many people to seek their fortune in the fabled Southern region known collectively as Nanyang. The story begins with three young men from the Fujian province.

A poor oyster collecter named Chen Xia (Terence Cao) wishes to marry his childhood sweetheart, Hong Dou (Cynthia Koh), but struggles to make ends meet.

The son of a wealthy tea plantation owner, Jia Fu (Xie Shaoguang) is a wastrel. Lazy and childish, the only saving grace to his character is his thoughtless generosity. In his naivete he loses his inheritance and is left with nothing but the support of his industrious wife, Ju (Ivy Lee).

After Tian's (Chunyu Shanshan) father dies on the trip to Nanyang, his widowed mother and his two siblings are forced to live a life of scavenging for food in the wilderness. After his sister is killed and his brother goes missing, he is hired by a rich merchant. His new employer is cruel and his meekness makes him an easy target for bullying, but he finds himself attracted to the man's second wife, Hai Yan (Yvonne Lim).

Despite the disparity between their situations and personalities, they each find themselves making the trip to the port of Singapore in Nanyang all with the same purpose: To seek a way out of their circumstances and a better future.

Cast
Xie Shaoguang as Zhang Jiafu
Terence Cao as Chen Xia
Cynthia Koh as Hongdou
Tay Ping Hui as Liu Mei
Yvonne Lim as Hai Yan
Ivy Lee as Ah Ju

1999 Accolades

Star Awards 2007

External links
Stepping Out (Chinese)

Singapore Chinese dramas
1990s Singaporean television series
1999 Singaporean television series debuts
1999 Singaporean television series endings
Channel 8 (Singapore) original programming